Manfredas Ruzgis (born 5 January 1997) is a footballer who plays as a striker for German club SC Wiedenbrück. Born in Germany, he represents Lithuania at international level.

Club career 
On 29 July 2016 Ruzgis moved to 1. FC Köln II.

International career 
Ruzgis was born in Germany and is of Lithuanian descent. Ruzgis made his debut for the Lithuania U21 on 1 September 2016 in the 2017 UEFA European Under-21 Championship qualification against Andorra.

In November 2016 Ruzgis received his first call-up to the senior Lithuania squad for a match against Slovakia.

References

External links 
 Manfredas Ruzgis at uefa.com
 Manfredas Ruzgis at Kicker

1997 births
Sportspeople from Siegen
German people of Lithuanian descent
Footballers from North Rhine-Westphalia
Living people
German footballers
Lithuanian footballers
Lithuania under-21 international footballers
Lithuania international footballers
Association football forwards
SC Paderborn 07 players
1. FC Köln II players
FC UNA Strassen players
SC Wiedenbrück 2000 players
Oberliga (football) players
Regionalliga players
Luxembourg National Division players
Lithuanian expatriate footballers
Expatriate footballers in Luxembourg
Lithuanian expatriate sportspeople in Luxembourg